Ministry of Works may refer to:

 Ministry of Works (Bahrain), a government ministry overseeing public works
 Ministry of Works and Human Settlement (Bhutan)
 Ministry of Works (imperial China), between the Tang and Qing dynasties
 Ministry of Works (Malaysia)
 Ministry of Works (Tanzania), a government ministry overseeing public works
 Ministry of Works (United Kingdom) (1943–1962), a former ministry now divided between the Department of the Environment and the Property Services Agency

See also
 Ministry of Public Works
 Ministry of Housing and Works (Pakistan)
 Pakistan Public Works Department
 Ministry of Works and Development of New Zealand
 Ministry of Works and Transport (disambiguation)
 Rivers State Ministry of Works